Douglas Laux (born January 20, 1983) is a former case officer for the Central Intelligence Agency, having served undercover in the Middle East and Afghanistan for eight years. Upon leaving the CIA, Laux wrote a New York Times Bestselling memoir, Left of Boom, which details his experiences serving amidst the Global War on Terror.

Service with CIA 
Laux attended Indiana University, earning a bachelor's degree in political science and East Asian studies with a focus on the Japanese language. He joined the CIA after a short stint working for the shipping company DHL following his graduation from IU. Laux was an officer in the Near East Division and served multiple tours in Afghanistan and the Middle East. Frustrated with the bureaucratic handling of the Syrian Civil War, Laux resigned from the Agency in February 2013. Upon his departure, Laux served with Joint Special Operations Command until 2016.

Career after CIA

Media 
In April 2016, Laux published his New York Times Bestselling memoir, Left of Boom: How A Young CIA Case Officer Penetrated the Taliban and Al-Qaeda. A year later, Laux appeared in six episodes of the Discovery Channel series Finding Escobar's Millions, which debuted on November 3, 2017. He is also credited as the executive producer and creator of the series. In September 2017, Laux's photography was featured in a Playboy Magazine article entitled, "In The Path of the Totality: Notes of a Veteran Chasing the Eclipse." Debuting on January 20, 2020, Laux appeared in eight episodes of the Bravo Channel series Spy Games. Laux's role was as an "Assessor" responsible for building challenges for contestants and then critiquing them on their performance.

Community 
In the fall of 2019, Laux founded the non-profit organization CVLSRVNT to better support active duty Ohioans deployed overseas.

Publications 
Laux, Douglas (2016). Left of Boom: How A Young CIA Case Officer Penetrated the Taliban and Al-Qaeda. New York: St. Martin's Press. .

References 

1983 births
Living people
People of the Central Intelligence Agency
Indiana University alumni
American non-fiction writers
Discovery Channel people
American spies